The Patient-Centered Primary Care Collaborative (PCPCC) is a coalition of more than 1,000 organizations and individuals — employers, consumer and patient/family advocacy groups, patient quality organizations, health plans, labor unions, hospitals, physicians, and other health professionals — that works to develop and advance an effective and efficient health system built on a strong foundation of preventative primary care, which is reliant on the patient-centered medical home (PCMH) model.  The PCHM model can be considered an approach to providing comprehensive care for children, youth, and adults.  The PCPCC is dedicated to advancing team-based, comprehensive primary care in partnership with patients and their families and serves as a broad-based national advocacy organization for the primary care patient centered medical home, providing information and networking opportunities to facilitate support for the PCMH.   They are headquartered in downtown Washington, D.C.

History
The Patient-Centered Primary Care Collaborative  was created in late 2006 when several large national employers came together with the four major U.S. primary care physician associations in order to:
Advance an effective and efficient health system built on a strong foundation of primary care and the patient-centered medical home (PCMH)
Facilitate improvements in patient-physician relations
Create a more effective and efficient model of healthcare delivery
To achieve these goals, the PCPCC has created an open forum where healthcare stakeholders freely communicate and work together to improve the future of the American medical system. The Collaborative has developed model language for inclusion in health reform proposals to include the PCMH concept. It also acts as a key source for the continued education of congressional representatives, the federal and state governments, and individual practices on the PCMH model as a superior form of healthcare delivery.

Activities
Having achieved significant success in getting the PCMH included as a foundational model of care in national and state-level health care reform efforts as well as in the commercial health insurance market, the Collaborative is now working with partners to obtain full-scale implementation so all patients and families can receive care in a PCMH.  In order to realize this vision for modern, robust primary care services, the Collaborative is working to:
Disseminate expert opinion, resources, and tools to assist clinicians in transforming their primary care setting into a PCMH
Educate policy makers, consumers, health care advocates, employers, purchasers, and payers on the benefits of receiving care in a PCMH
Share evidence and outcomes of the PCMH that demonstrate improved quality, lower costs, and increased efficiencies in care
Advocate for policies and payment models necessary to implement and sustain PCMHs in the community
Disseminate information about implementation of promising PCMH initiatives

In addition to the work of the PCPCC, the Patient-Centered Primary Care Foundation (PCPCF) currently engages in education of the PCMH model through public conferences, webinars, policy papers, guides, and toolkits.

Member Organizations
Today, PCPCC's membership represents more than 1,200 stakeholder organizations and 50 million health care consumers throughout the U.S. split into two different tiers of membership.

Executive Committee Members

The PCPCC's Executive Committee is a group of members that provide leadership and work in partnership with PCPCC's Board of Directors and staff.  Members represent a range of health care stakeholders, including health professional associations, employers, purchasers, health plans, health systems, pharmaceutical firms, professional associations, and quality improvement organizations. Member benefits include access to exclusive leadership roles, events and organizational initiatives. Each member contributes annual dues that support the development of educational tools, publications and conferences. 

General Members

The Collaborative's general public membership is free of charge and includes many benefits. General members are invited to join the Collaborative's national weekly call and receive monthly updates on the work of the five Centers. Members also have free access to many Collaborative resources.

See also
Patient-Centered Medical Home

References

External links
 Official website

Healthcare reform in the United States
Organizations based in Washington, D.C.